Luciosoma trinema is a species of cyprinid fish found on the Malay peninsula, Sumatra and Borneo.

References

Luciosoma
Fish described in 1852